Precious Blood Secondary School is a girls' school in Chai Wan in Hong Kong.

History 

In 1945, after World War II, many children could not afford to go to school. As a result, the Sisters of the Precious Blood rented a place in Wan Chai as a school and named it Righteous Virtue Number 2 Female Secondary School, which was dependent on government subsidies. Seven years later, in 1952, it moved to North Point where the Sisters of the Precious Blood built a playground for it to commemorate Jesus Christ, and changed the name of the school to Precious Blood Secondary School.

See also
 List of secondary schools in Hong Kong

External links 

Chai Wan
Secondary schools in Hong Kong
Girls' schools in Hong Kong
Catholic secondary schools in Hong Kong